The Pacific Seacraft 31 is a bluewater cruising yacht produced since 1987 by Pacific Seacraft, now of Washington, North Carolina. Although of GRP construction, the yacht is traditionally built with a cutter rig, skeg-hung rudder and semi-long keel. The yacht is a cruising design, with a high displacement designed by Bill Crealock.

See also
Pacific Seacraft 34
Pacific Seacraft 37

External links
Pacific Seacraft
The Pacific Seacraft 31
data and overview on sailboat.guide

Sailing yachts
Boats designed by W. I. B. Crealock
1980s sailboat type designs
Sailboat types built by Pacific Seacraft